The Mayor of the West Midlands is a directly elected political post who chairs the West Midlands Combined Authority, covering the Birmingham metropolitan area and Coventry.

The first election took place on Thursday 4 May 2017. Andy Street, the inaugural Mayor, was originally due to hold office for three years, with the second election for the post taking place in May 2020. This election was delayed for a year due to the COVID-19 pandemic, so the inaugural mayoral term was extended by a year, with the second term length being reduced to three years between 2021 and 2024. The Mayor's term of office will return to four years from 2024 thereafter.

Powers and functions

Homes and Land
The Mayor has devolved compulsory purchase powers, and is responsible for the West Midlands spatial framework and land commission.

Transport
The Mayor is responsible for franchised bus services, allowing for standardised fares and branding on all bus services in the county, similar to how London's bus network operates. The Mayor is also responsible for the West Midlands Key Route Network, which is managed by Transport for West Midlands on behalf of the Mayor.

Devolution
The Mayor is responsible for ensuring that the first devolution deal is put into action and acts on behalf of the region in negotiating future devolution deals with central government.

List of mayors

References

Local government in the West Midlands (county)
West Midlands